34 Battalion was a light infantry battalion that was part of the SWATF.

History
34 Battalion was commonly known as the "Kavangoland Battalion". It was established in 1975 as 1 Kavango Battalion as a ceremonial guard of honour. It was then renamed 34 Battalion .

Operational Area
The Mashari base was in an old TB hospital. They were co-located with a BRUSH unit.(Bush Reconnaissance Unit Signal HQ)

As part of Sector 20, their main area of responsibility was from Rundu West as far as Sector 10 and East up to the Bagani bridge.

Personnel
Initially 34 Battalion was manned primarily with Kavango troops but later with a large number of turned SWAPO Cadres. The first Kavango instructors were trained in 1979. The first Kavango officer was commissioned in 1980 and the first group of sergeants were promoted that same year.

Structure
34 Battalion generally consisted of:
 a HQ, 
 a Support Company, 
 4 Line Companies (Buffel APC), 
 and an Armoured Reconnaissance wing of 2 Platoons and 4 Eland 90s.

There was usually also an attached SA Army Infantry Company.
34 Battalion's role was primarily that of light infantry, with some mounted (berede) troops and a Romeo Mike team (Afrikaans Reaksie Mag).

Engagements
The unit had its first skirmish in 1979. Thereafter they took part in most of the major operations in the operational area. They were credited with completely suppressing all insurgency activities in the Kavango region by 1987.

Renaming
The South West Africa Territory Force SWATF renumbered battalion numbers according to their geographical positioning on the border. The prefix 10 pertained to battalions operating to the west of the Kavango River, 20 to the Kavango or central region and 70 to the eastern region. Under this system, 34 Battalion was renamed 202 Battalion in 1980.

Officers Commanding

 Captain Paul Swanepoel 1978
 Commandant Charlie Hochapfel 1978-1981
 Commandant J.M.A. Swanepoel 1982-1983 
 Commandant Manie van Rensburg 1984 (acting)
 Commandant J.R. Liebenberg 1984-1987
 Commandant Pieter van der Merwe 1988-1989

Choir
The unit's choir was formed in 1985. They won their section of the Roodepoort Eisteddford 1987.

The choir's main exposure to the public occurred when they took part in the Kavango song festival. They won acclaim at the 1996  song festival at the University of Stellenbosch and were invited to perform for the State President at his Cape Town residence.
They also had a combined tour with the Drakensberg Boys' Choir.
Lt Col Zeeman, who facilitated the  tour, later went on to become the Chairman of the Board of  Board of Governors.

Roll of Honour

Notes

References

Military history of Namibia
Military units and formations of South Africa in the Border War
Military units and formations established in 1990
Military units and formations disestablished in 1991